Taean Seaside National Park in Taean County was designated as the 13th National Park in South Korea in 1978.

It contains various coastal ecosystems and variety of coastal landmarks such as 26 beaches, sand dunes, rocky formations, and 72 islands along the 230 km coastline.

Regarding the natural resources, 1,195 animal species, 774 plant species, and 671 marine species including minke whales and finless porpoises are distributed within this national park. Endangered species include Eurasian otter, Chinese egret, Eremias argus, Seoul frog, Ranunculus kazusensis, and so on.

References

 Korea National Park Service. 2008. National Parks of Korea
 http://english.knps.or.kr/Knp/Taeanhaean/Intro/Introduction.aspx?MenuNum=1&Submenu=Npp

External links
The park's page on Korea National Park Service's website

National parks of South Korea
Protected areas established in 1978
Parks in South Chungcheong Province